Haggard Cat is an English hardcore punk band formed by the Nottingham duo, Matt Reynolds and Tom Marsh (ex-Heck). Haggard Cat was originally a side project but since the split of Heck it has become Reynolds and Marsh's main project.

In 2017 the band toured with Jamie Lenman, DZ Deathrays and Weirds, as well as playing a headline slot at Camden Rocks and opening the main stage at ArcTanGent festival. The band have continued to play around the UK and Europe since the release of their debut album, Challenger. UK festival appearances have included Glastonbury Festival and 2000 Trees Festival.

Haggard Cat signed to Earache Records in 2018 and commented, "We're so proud to sign to Earache and follow in the footsteps of some of our absolute heroes; we're in some great company and we can't wait to show the world the beast that we've been working on. The future is going to be loud! Wear protection!". They then toured with Kent hardcore band Feed the Rhino early that year.

On 1 October 2019, Haggard Cat announced their new album Common Sense Holiday via social media. It was released on 13 March 2020 via Earache Records.

Haggard Cat independently released their Cheer Up EP on the 3rd of September 2021.

Their postponed 2020 tour finally kicked off in September 2021 to support the release of Cheer Up.

Discography

Musical style 
Sonically the band are more akin to the Jack White, Royal Blood and Death From Above 1979 world than they are Heck. It is rock, it is blues and it is heavy metal. Matt Reynolds (guitarist and frontman) uses a two amp setup to get the distinct sound. A A/B system of guitar and bass amplifiers. Coupling this with a pedalboard, Matt can create low bass effects and squealing guitar sounds. Matt relies heavily on a green Russian Big Muff to get his distinct fuzzy sound. Reynolds' tone combined with Tom Marsh' frantic drum playing, creates a unique style of music.

References

External links

Musical groups from Nottingham
British hardcore punk groups
Musical groups established in 2018
2018 establishments in England